The 2010 Cameron Highlands bus crash was, until 2013, the worst road accident in Malaysian history. Twenty-seven passengers of the double-decked coach bus, mostly Thai tourists, were killed in the accident which took place near Cameron Highlands of the Perak-Pahang border. It occurred on 20 December 2010 at approximately 11:40 am, when the bus driver, Omar Shahidan, lost control of the bus as it was going down an incline and it crashed into a rocky slope at 150 kilometres an hour, off the Second East-West Highway.

References

Bus incidents in Malaysia
Cameron Highlands bus crash
Cameron Highlands Bus Crash, 2010
December 2010 events in Asia